Micheál Houlihan (born 1997) is an Irish hurler. At club level he plays with Kilmallock, while he is also a member of the Limerick senior hurling team. He usually lines out as a forward.

Career

Houlihan first played hurling at juvenile and underage levels with the Kilmallock club. He had already joined the club's senior team when he captained the under-21 side to a county title in 2018. Houlihan was the championship's top scorer when Kilmallock beat Patrickswell to win the Limerick SHC title in 2021.

After being overlooked at minor level, Houlihan first played for the Limerick at under-21 level in 2018. He was drafted onto the senior team in 2022 and was part of the extended panel when Limerick won that year's All-Ireland title. Houlihan made his debut during the 2023 National League.

Career statistics

Honours

Kilmallock
Limerick Senior Hurling Championship: 2021
Limerick Under-21 Hurling Championship: 2018 (c)

Limerick
All-Ireland Senior Hurling Championship: 2022
Munster Senior Hurling Championship: 2022

References

1997 births
Living people
Kilmallock hurlers
Limerick inter-county hurlers